Senator Munroe may refer to:

Allen Munroe (1819–1884), New York State Senate
George H. Munroe (1844–1912), Illinois State Senate
James Munroe (New York politician) (1815–1869), New York State Senate